

List of Ambassadors

Mattanya Cohen 2017 - 
Moshe Bachar 2013 - 2017
Eliahu Lopez 2009 - 2013
Isaac Bachman 2006 - 2009
Yaacov Paran 2000 - 2006
Shlomo Cohen 1993 - 2001
Yaacov Deckel 1989 - 1993
Azriel Gal-On 1986 - 1989
Moshe Dayan (diplomat) 1981 - 1986
Eliezer Armon 1977 - 1981
Avigdor Shoham 1975 - 1977
Aria Bustan 1971 - 1972
Moshe Tov 1968 - 1971
Ambassador Joshua Nissim Shai 1959 - 1964
Minister Yossef Keisari (Non-Resident, Mexico City) 1954 - 1956

References

Guatemala
Israel